is a Japanese model. Photographed by Garo Aida, she commonly poses in magazines with Mao Kobayashi, as well as other models.

Azusa burst into the modeling scene at 13 years old when she cast in a movie at the Villa Jatayu.

Works
《Sunshine Girl age 12》
《美少女予报 age 13》写真集系列（7部）
《制服日和  age 13》写真集系列（7部）
《清纯いもうと倶楽部  age 13》写真集系列（4部）
《清纯いもうと倶楽部  age 14》写真集系列（9部）
《age 15 写真集》

See also
Mao Kobayashi (Japanese idol)
Saaya Irie
Haruka Suenaga

References
 https://web.archive.org/web/20070331224405/http://suxipo.com/view/idol-photobooks/Azusa-Hibino/?
 https://web.archive.org/web/20070306052805/http://shibuya.cool.ne.jp/tighthole2/

Citations

Japanese gravure idols
21st-century Japanese actresses
Living people
1990 births